HMCS Margaree was a  that served in the Royal Canadian Navy and later the Canadian Forces from 1957–1992. She underwent conversion to a destroyer helicopter escort (DDH) in the mid-1960s and was officially reclassed with pennant DDH 230 on 15 October 1965. The vessel served until 1992 when it was discarded, sold for scrap and broken up in 1994.

Design and description

The need for the St. Laurent class came about in 1949 when Canada joined NATO and the Cold War was in its infancy. The Royal Canadian Navy (RCN) was assigned responsibility for anti-submarine warfare (ASW) and controlling sea space in the western North Atlantic. The St Laurent class were built to an operational requirement much like that which produced the British Type 12, and were powered by the same machinery plant. The rounded deck-edge forward was adopted to prevent ice forming. The vessels were designed to operate in harsh Canadian conditions. They were built to counter nuclear, biological and chemical attack conditions, which led to a design with a rounded hull, a continuous main deck, and the addition of a pre-wetting system to wash away contaminants. The living spaces on the ship were part of a "citadel" which could be sealed off from contamination for the crew safety. The ships were sometimes referred to as "Cadillacs" for their relatively luxurious crew compartments; these were also the first Canadian warships to have a bunk for every crew member since previous warship designs had used hammocks.

The destroyer escorts had a crew of 12 officers and 237 enlisted.

Armament
The St. Laurent class was fitted with twin /L50 caliber guns in two mounts for engaging both surface and air targets. The ships were also fitted with two single-mounted  guns. The class's anti-submarine armament consisted of a pair of triple-barreled Mk. NC 10 Limbo ASW mortars in a stern well. The stern well had a roller top to close it off from following seas. As with the British Type 12 design, the provision for long-range homing torpedoes (in this case BIDDER [Mk 20E] or the US Mark 35 were included. However, they were never fitted.

Machinery
The vessels of the St. Laurent class had two Babcock & Wilcox water tube boilers installed.

DDH conversion
Following successful trials aboard the frigate  and sister ship , plans to convert the St. Laurent class took shape. The development of the beartrap, installed in  during her 1962–63 conversion, finalized the concept. By keeping the aircraft secure, the beartrap eliminated the need for deck handling from landing to the hangar, or from hangar to takeoff.

In the conversion to a helicopter-carrying vessel, Margaree was gutted except for machinery and some forward spaces. The hull was strengthened, fueling facilities for the helicopter and activated fin stabilizers installed. The fin stabilizers were to reduce roll in rough weather during helicopter operations. All seven St Laurents were fitted with helicopter platforms and SQS 504 Variable Depth Sonar (VDS). The single funnel was altered to twin stepped funnels to permit the forward extension of the helicopter hangar. To make room for the helicopter deck, the aft 3-inch mount and one of the Limbos were removed. The two 40 mm guns were also removed.

DELEX program

In the late 1970s, under the Destroyer Life Extension (DELEX) program was commissioned to upgrade ten of the St. Laurent-class ships with new electronics, machinery, and hull upgrades and repairs. However, only enough was done to keep the ships in service into the late 1980s. For the St. Laurents, this meant hull and machinery repairs only.

Service history
Margaree was laid down on 12 September 1951 by Halifax Shipyards at Halifax, Nova Scotia and launched 29 March 1956. The ship was commissioned into the Royal Canadian Navy on 5 October 1957 at Halifax and initially carried the hull identification DDE 230 as a destroyer escort.

After commissioning, Margaree was sent to join the west coast fleet. She was assigned to the Second Canadian Escort Squadron. In January 1958, the destroyer escort departed Esquimalt, British Columbia for a training cruise around the Pacific, returning in April. On 25 September 1964 the ship began her conversion to a helicopter carrying destroyer (DDH) at Victoria Machinery Depot. The ship completed her refit on 15 October 1965 and transferred to the east coast. In 1968, the ship was a part of the Seventh Canadian Escort Squadron.

In January 1973, Assiniboine and auxiliary ship  were deployed to Standing Naval Force Atlantic (STANAVFORLANT), NATO's standing fleet. This was the first time two Canadian warships deployed together. In June 1973, Margaree collided with the fisheries research vessel Cygnus. In September 1976, Margaree took part in the major NATO naval exercise Teamwork 76. On 1 April 1979, Margaree sank the bow section of the commercial ship Kurdistan, which had broken in half on 15 March. The vessel was selected by the Canadian Forces for the Destroyer Life Extension (DELEX) program and completed this refit on 28 November 1980. The refit was begun by Vickers Ltd. at Montreal on 5 May 1980. However the hull was towed to HMC Dockyard at Halifax when it appeared that the ship would be ice-bound before completion.

In 1981, Margaree was pulled out of a major naval exercise due to cracks in their boiler heads. Following her DELEX refit, Margaree served several times with STANAVFORLANT. On 8 February 1991, two divers from Margaree drowned when conducting an inspection of the seawater intake pipes of the American frigate  while in port at Funchal, Portugal, after becoming trapped. In August 1991, the ship took part in the re-enactment at Argentia of the signing of the Atlantic Charter, a pivotal policy of the Second World War.

Margaree was paid off from active service in the Canadian Forces on 2 May 1992. The vessel was sold to Global Shipping Company of Tampa, Florida on 3 February 1994. She was towed to India to be broken up in 1994.

References

Notes

Citations

Sources

External links

 Canadian Navy of Yesterday & Today: St. Laurent-class destroyer escort

St. Laurent-class destroyers
1956 ships
Ships built in Nova Scotia
Cold War destroyers of Canada